Westville Village Historic District is a historic district representing most of the commercial center of the Westville neighborhood of New Haven, Connecticut.  This center developed in the 19th century as an industrial mill village distinct from the city center, and retains many architectural features of that period.  The district was listed on the National Register of Historic Places in 2003, and its boundaries were increased slightly in 2006.

Description and history
When the New Haven Colony was established in the 17th century, the Westville area was mainly agricultural, with Whalley Avenue providing the principal means of access from homes in the town center to those lands.  Its village beginnings date roughly to 1797, when a bridge was built over the West River, turning Whalley Avenue into a more important transportation link.  Some early settlers had harnessed the power of the local waterways for saw and gristmills, and there were gunpowder mills in the area that were targeted by British raids in the American Revolutionary War.  In the late 18th and early 19th centuries, larger mills devoted to textile and paper production were established.  This led to further industrialization later in the 19th century, and the village gained further significance when a horse trolley line was extended to it in 1861.  Westville was annexed to New Haven in 1872.

The village as it developed includes number of buildings that were originally built at residences, but have mostly been converted to commercial uses, as well as purpose-built commercial and mixed commercial-residential buildings. The listing was amended in 2006 to add the former Westville Theater building at 827 Whalley Avenue, an Early Commercial style building that was built in 1912. The theater building is now occupied by an antiques store.

Contributing properties
When listed, the district included 34 buildings, of which 30 were deemed contributing buildings.  The contributing buildings are:
446 Blake Street, Greist Manufacturing Company
495 Blake Street, Geometric Tool Company
512 Blake Street, c. 1840 (See photo #13 in accompanying photo set)
15-17 Tour Avenue, Italianate, c.1905
23-25 Tour Avenue, Queen Anne, c.1905
413 West Rock Avenue, a Queen Anne style house
416-418 West Rock Avenue, Queen Anne
417 West Rock Avenue
420-422 West Rock Avenue
426 West Rock Avenue, Tudor Revival
831-835 Whalley Avenue, the Alfred Minor Building
837-839 Whalley Avenue
843 Whalley Avenue
845-847 Whalley Avenue
859-861 Whalley Avenue
865 Whalley Avenue
867 Whalley Avenue
873-875 Whalley Avenue
879 Whalley Avenue
881 Whalley Avenue
882-888 Whalley Avenue, Hotel Edgewood (photo #9)
883-889 Whalley Avenue
893-901 Whalley Avenue
898 Whalley Avenue
900-902 Whalley Avenue
903-911 Whalley Avenue, a Masonic hall built for the Olive Branch Temple Corporation
904-906 Whalley Avenue
914-918 Whalley Avenue
920 Whalley Avenue
949 Whalley Avenue, the Westville Masonic Temple, from 1926 (see photo #6 in photos accompanying NRHP nomination)

Gallery

See also
National Register of Historic Places listings in New Haven, Connecticut

References

External links

Westville Village Historic District, New Haven Preservation Trust website (text excerpt from NRHP nomination)

Federal architecture in Connecticut
Greek Revival architecture in Connecticut
Historic districts in New Haven, Connecticut
National Register of Historic Places in New Haven, Connecticut
Historic districts on the National Register of Historic Places in Connecticut